Maria Vasilievna Shukshina (born 27 May 1967) is a Russian actress.  Her film credits include Burnt by the Sun 2: Exodus (2010), Bury Me Behind the Baseboard (2009) and American Daughter (1995).  Her television credits include  (2004), Take me with You (2008) and McMafia (2018). She hosted the show Wait for Me on Channel One Russia and was a member of the judging panel on Minute of Fame.

Biography

Early life and education
Maria Shukshina was born in Moscow, the daughter of Russian writer, film director and actor Vasily Shukshin and Russian film actress Lidiya Fedoseyeva-Shukshina. The actress has an older half-sister Anastasia, and younger sister Olga.

She graduated from the translation department of Moscow's Institute of Foreign Languages. After the institute she worked as an interpreter and broker on the Russian commodity exchange.

Film and television career
In 1969, at the age of one and a half years, Shukshina starred in the segment "Brother" in the anthology film of Vasily Shukshin Strange people. And at the age of five Masha, together with her sister Olga, played the daughters of the Rastorguev family in the film Happy Go Lucky.

Two years later, the actress appeared again on the screen. She played the role of Vishnyak's daughter in the film directed by Sergei Nikonenko Birds over the City.

In the mid-1990s, Maria Shukshina starred in several popular films. In Karen Shakhnazarov's film American Daughter (1995), the actress played a practical and unsentimental businesswoman, who flees from her husband along with her young daughter to America. In the same year Shukshina played a similar role in the film What a Wonderful Game by Pyotr Todorovsky where Maria appeared as a beautiful student who, without hesitation, hands over her classmates to state security agencies.

In the early 2000s in Alla Surikova's comedy television series Perfect Couple the actress played a brief role of a journalist who interviews Armen Dzhigarkhanyan.

Maria had a lead role in Vsevolod Shilovsky's television series People and Shadows: The Secrets of the Puppet Theater (2001).

In the 2004 television series Dear Masha Berezina played Katya, who independently tries to make a career in the modeling business.

In the serial film Brezhnev, the actress appears as Nina Korovyakova, the last romantic interest of Leonid Brezhnev, a woman who had a certain influence on the omnipotent general secretary.

In the popular melodramatic series Take me with you (2008) Maria played the main role - Maria Karetnikova, a rich woman, disillusioned with her life of luxury.

The actress played the character of Polina Ivanova in the melodrama of Vlad Furman Terrorist Ivanova. In the film the son of Polina Ivanova becomes a cripple through the fault of an influential businessman, and her husband dies in jail. The woman decides to take revenge.

In the drama Bury Me Behind the Baseboard, shot by director Sergei Snezhkin based on the self-titled autobiographical novel by Pavel Sanayev, Shukshina played the role of Olga, the weak-willed mother of the main hero Sasha.

From the latest bright projects of Maria Shukshina, you can name the films: Burnt by the Sun 2: Exodus, Deli Case No. 1, Made in the USSR, The Fire-place Guest, Who, If not I?, Stanitsa, Yolki 3, Good-bye, boys, Mannequin, Outgoing nature, Husband on call, His own stranger, Yolki 5, Such work.

In 2018 she played Oksana Godman, mother of the protagonist Alex Godman, in the BBC crime drama McMafia.

Television host
From 1999 to 2014, Maria Shukshina hosted the program Wait for Me on Channel One. She a member of the judging panel on the fifth season of Minute of Fame. In 2018 she is to host the talk show A Visit in the Morning.

Views
During the COVID-19 pandemic, Shukshina became an anti-vaccination activist, stating that the existing vaccines have not been sufficiently tested and should not be used. Instagram restricted following her account, displaying the warning that the account posted false information on a regular basis.

In 2022, she supported Russia's invasion of Ukraine, calling the troops to finish the mission.

On 8 July 2022, the Meshchansky District Court of Moscow sentenced Aleksei Gorinov, a municipal councilor of the Krasnoselsky District, to seven years in prison. He was accused of disseminating “knowingly false information” about the Russian Armed Forces under the recently introduced Article 207.3 of the Criminal Code of the Russian Federation. His arrest and ensuing sentencing followed a statement he made about Russian aggression in Ukraine during a council meeting on 15 March 2022. The case was opened after Shukshina posted a video, and two State Duma deputies said that they had written statements.

Honors
In 2008, she received the honorary title of Meritorious Artist of Russia.

Personal life
 First husband – Artyom Tregubenko (divorced).
 Daughter – Anna Tregubenko (born 2 July 1988), studied at the Faculty of Producing at Gerasimov Institute of Cinematography.
 Grandson – Vyacheslav (born 21 November 2014).
 Second husband – businessman Aleksey Kasatkin (divorced).
 Son – Makar Kasatkin (born 20 November 1997).
 Grandson – Mark (born 20 April 2018).
 Third husband – lawyer and businessman Boris Vishnyakov.
 Twins son – Foma Vishnyakov and Foka Vishnyakov (born 31 July 2005).

Filmography

References

External links

Living people
1967 births
Russian film actresses
Russian television actresses
21st-century Russian actresses
Actresses from Moscow
Russian television presenters
Honored Artists of the Russian Federation
Recipients of the Nika Award
Academicians of the Russian Academy of Cinema Arts and Sciences "Nika"
Recipients of the Medal of the Order "For Merit to the Fatherland" II class
Russian women television presenters
Russian YouTubers
Mordvin people